A by-election was held for the Australian House of Representatives seat of North Sydney on 11 March 1911. This was triggered by the death of Liberal MP George Edwards.

The by-election was won by Liberal candidate Granville Ryrie.

Results

References

1911 elections in Australia
New South Wales federal by-elections
1910s in Sydney